The Yar (from French "yard") was a restaurant and theatre in 19th Century Moscow frequented by Pushkin, Tolstoy, Chekhov and Maxim Gorky. It was famous for its Sokolovsky gypsy choir. The Yar ran from 1826 to 1925 on the street known as Kuznetsky Most.

The second Yar was opened on the St. Petersburg chaussée built by Adolf Erichson 1909-1913. The restaurant became popular among Russian elite. It was visited by Leonid Andreev, Konstantin Balmont, Anton Chekhov, Maxim Gorky, Alexander Kuprin, Savva Morozov, Grigory Rasputin, and Fyodor Shalyapin.

The current Yar is in the Sovietsky Hotel on Leningradsky Prospect (Moscow).

References

Restaurants in Moscow